The SoCal VoCals are the first of nine a cappella groups from the University of Southern California. Founded in 1996, the group's signature achievement is being the only a cappella group to win five titles in ICCA, which it accomplished in 2008, 2010, 2012, 2015, and 2018. In 2020, The A Cappella Archive ranked The SoCal VoCals at #1 out of all ICCA-competing groups.

The group comprises between 13 and 19 male and female students who arrange and sing songs from multiple genres, including pop, rock, and jazz. The group has released seven albums and has performed in venues including the Staples Center, Walt Disney Concert Hall, the Rose Bowl, the Los Angeles House of Blues, the Hollywood Bowl, Carnegie Hall and the Getty Center.

The SoCal VoCals are known for their energetic performance style and school spirit: they are the only USC a cappella group to perform a rendition of the University's Alma Mater.

History 

In April, 2008, the SoCal VoCals took first place in the ICCAs at New York City's Lincoln Center, winning the title "Grand Champions." The next morning, they were featured on The Today Show.

In April, 2010, the SoCal VoCals returned to Lincoln Center and reclaimed the ICCA title, making them one of only two groups to win that title more than once.

On April 29, 2012, the SoCal VoCals performed in competition at Town Hall in New York City.  They won their third ICCA title, and became the first to have won the title by winning the Wildcard round.

On April 18, 2015, the SoCal VoCals competed at the Beacon Theatre to win for the fourth time, claiming the newly minted trophy and adding to their already-unchallenged record of victories..

On April 21, 2018, the SoCal Vocals returned to The Beacon Theatre to win ICCA for the fifth time. The SoCal VoCals are the first group to ever win ICCA five times.

In September, 2018, The SoCal VoCals took home second place at the A Cappella Open at Carnegie Hall in New York City.

Notable Spinoffs 

In November, 2009, one current members of the USC SoCal VoCals joined with seven VoCal alumni to compete as "The SoCals" on NBC's first a cappella competition, The Sing-Off.

In 2010, five current and former members of the VoCals competed in Season 2 of "The Sing-Off" as members of "The Backbeats."

In 2011 Scott Hoying, a member of the SoCal VoCals, led a team of five people to win NBC's third season of "The Sing-Off" as Pentatonix.

In 2013, VoCal alumni Emily Goglia competed on The Sing-Off as one of two leaders for the group Element.

In 2013, SoCal VoCals Kenton Chen, Rachel Saltzman, Ben Bram, and Allie Feder joined with other Sing-Off alumni to form an a cappella group called Level. They have since performed on The Late Late Show with James Corden. Another SoCal VoCal alum, Gabriel Leung, has joined them on occasion.

In 2014, SoCal VoCal alumni Ben Bram co-founded A Cappella Academy along with fellow Sing-Off arranger Rob Dietz, and former Pentatonix bass vocalist, Avi Kaplan. The camp has produced many of the nation's top a cappella singers. 

In 2018, SoCal VoCal then-current member Elizabeth Gaba placed in the top 24 for American Idol.

In 2018, SoCal VoCal members Kaylah Baker and Nina Nelson left The SoCal VoCals to be a part of the all-female a cappella group, Citizen Queen.

In 2019, tenor Jej Vinson reached the top 16 on NBC's The Voice and his blind audition of "Passionfruit" has amassed almost 10 million views on YouTube as of March 2020.

Notable alumni 

 Ross Golan
 Scott Hoying
 Ben Bram
 Nina Ann Nelson, member of Citizen Queen
 Kaylah Sharve, member of Citizen Queen
 Audra Levi aka Audra Lee
 James Snyder
 Rachel Bearer, member of ARORA
 Kelley Jakle
 Juliette Goglia
 Catherine Ricafort

Discography

Albums
 This Ain't No Choir, Babe (1997)
 This 2 Shall Rock (1999)
 V3: Previously Unreleased (2001)
 The SoCal VoCals (2004)
 Get In. ROCK. Get Out. (2006)
 Unanimous (2009)
 Permit to Harmonize (2013)
 VoCabulary (2016)

Extended Plays
 2010 ICCA Set EP
 V (2018 ICCA Set EP)

References

External links
 

American vocal groups
Collegiate a cappella groups
Student activities at the University of Southern California
Musical groups established in 1995